Richard Raphael Cotter (October 4, 1889 – April 12, 1945) was a professional baseball catcher. After playing at Manhattan College he played 20 games for the 1911 Philadelphia Phillies and another 20 for the 1912 Chicago Cubs. He later played in the American Association in 1913, the International League from 1920 to 1921 and the New York-Pennsylvania League in 1923 and 1924.

External links

1889 births
1945 deaths
Major League Baseball catchers
Philadelphia Phillies players
Chicago Cubs players
Baseball players from New Hampshire
Indianapolis Indians players
Jersey City Skeeters players
Reading Marines players
Reading Aces players
Binghamton Triplets players
Burials at Holy Cross Cemetery, Brooklyn
Warren Warriors players